The Bristol Ten-seater and Bristol Brandon were British single-engine biplane transport aircraft built by the Bristol Aeroplane Company in the early 1920s. Only three were built, two of which were used as civil transports and one of which (the Bristol Brandon) served with the Royal Air Force.

Design and development
In 1919 and 1920, Frank Barnwell, chief designer of the Bristol Aeroplane Company, considered designs for a commercial transport aircraft, ranging from single-engine, three-seat aircraft to four-engine aircraft carrying ten passengers, none of which were built. Early in 1921, the British government decided to provide subsidies for approved airlines, so Bristol's management authorised Barnwell to proceed with a design for a single-engined transport aircraft. It was intended to be powered by a Bristol Jupiter engine, but this had not yet been type-approved, so the initial prototype was fitted with a Napier Lion engine instead.

The Lion-engined prototype, the Bristol Type 62, or Bristol Ten-seater, with the registration G-EAWY first flew on 21 June 1921. The Ten-seater was a large, two-bay biplane, with a cabin for nine passengers and a forward cockpit for the single pilot.

The second aircraft, the Bristol Type 75 was powered by the preferred Jupiter engine, which was mounted forward of a fireproof bulkhead, with the entire engine installation (or "power-egg") capable of being swung open like a gate to allow easy access to the rear of the engine. The Type 75 was designed to accommodate eight passengers and two crew. This aircraft, registered G-EBEV, first flew in July 1922. A third aircraft, the Bristol Type 79 was ordered by the Air Council to meet a requirement (Specification 32/22) for a single-engined ambulance landplane for the Royal Air Force. It was fitted with wings of greater chord, and had accommodation for three stretchers and an attendant or two stretchers and four sitting patients.

Operational history
The Type 62 had its Certificate of Airworthiness awarded on 14 February 1922 and was transferred to Instone Air Line for service on its London-to-Paris route, carrying both passengers and cargo.  It was later transferred to Handley Page Transport Ltd.

The Type 75 received its Certificate of Airworthiness on 16 July 1924. By this time, Instone Air Lines had merged with the other three subsidised British airlines to form Imperial Airways. Imperial had a policy of using only multi-engine aircraft for passenger flights, so the Type 75 was converted into a freighter to carry 1,800 lb (820 kg) of cargo, going into service on the London-Cologne route on 22 July 1924, continuing in service until 1926.

The Type 79 first flew on 19 March 1924 and was delivered to the RAF, who named the aircraft the Bristol Brandon in 1925. It was overweight at full load and did not go into overseas service, being used as an ambulance at RAF Halton together with the Avro Andover.

Variants
Bristol Type 62
First aircraft, powered by 450 hp (340 kW) Napier Lion engine.
Bristol Type 75
Second aircraft, powered by 425 hp ( kW) Bristol Jupiter IV engine.
Bristol Type 79
Third aircraft built as a military transport and air ambulance aircraft for the RAF. Powered by Bristol Jupiter IV engine.

Operators

Royal Air Force
Handley Page Transport
Imperial Airways
Instone Air Line

Specifications (Type 75)

See also

References

Citations

Bibliography

External links

 Contemporary technical description of the Bristol Ten-seater with Napier Lion engine, including photographs and drawings.
Photos of the Bristol Brandon J6997 

Single-engined tractor aircraft
Biplanes
1920s British airliners
Ten-seater
Aircraft first flown in 1921